K. Harishkumar was elected unopposed on 4 June 2018 to the Karnataka Legislative Council. Out of 11 seats, the INC won 4 seats, JD(S) 2 and BJP 5.

References

Indian National Congress politicians from Karnataka